Shredded beef is a preparation of beef that features in dishes from various cuisines. Shredded beef is sometimes prepared using beef brisket and chuck roast. Pot roast is also sometimes shredded.

List of shredded beef dishes
 Burritos are sometimes prepared with shredded beef
 Carne asada is sometimes shredded.
 Shredded beef is one of several meat fillings that can be used to make gorditas.
 Enchiladas are sometimes prepared with shredded beef.
 Jang-jorim is made with shredded beef.
 Machacado con huevo is a shredded dry beef and scrambled egg dish believed to have originated in Ciénega de Flores, Mexico.
 Mission burrito can be made with stewed and shredded beef (machaca)
 Pabellón criollo is a shredded beef stew served with a plate of rice and black beans that is considered by many to be Venezuela's national dish
 In Mexico, picadillo is made with shredded beef.
 Quesadilla
 Ropa vieja (old clothes) originated in the Canary Islands (Spain) and is typically a shredded flank, brisket or skirt steak in a tomato sauce base.
 Salpicon is a salad that includes shredded beef and is common in Mexico.
 Sandwiches 
 Tacos are sometimes prepared with shredded beef
 Tangpyeongchae (Korean pronunciation: [tʰaŋpʰjʌŋtɕʰɛ]) is a Korean cuisine dish made by mixing julienned nokdumuk, mung bean sprouts, watercress, stir-fried shredded beef, thinly shredded red pepper and lightly broiled gim. It was part of the Korean royal court cuisine. It is seasoned with a sauce made with ganjang, vinegar, sugar, sesame seeds and sesame oil. It is often made with nokdumuk, a type of jelly.
 Tinga (dish) is a Mexican dish usually prepared with shredded beef or chicken.
 Yukgaejang is a spicy Korean cuisine soup dish made from shredded beef with scallions and other ingredients simmered together. It is a variety of gomguk once part of Korean royal court cuisine and is believed to be healthful.
 Yukhoe was made with shredded beef marinated in spring onion, minced garlic, pepper, oil, honey, pine nuts, sesame and salt, according to the 19th century cookbook Siuijeonseo It is served with a dipping sauce, chogochujang (Hangul: 초고추장), chili pepper condiment mixed with vinegar and sugar) can be altered to taste, with pepper or honey.

See also

 Dried shredded squid
 Ground beef – typically chopped with a meat grinder
 List of beef dishes
 Pulled pork – shredded pork
 Rousong – a dried pork, fish or chicken food that includes pulling the meat fibers apart in its preparation

References

External links
 

Beef dishes